Unión Catolica Obrera (Catholic Workers Union) was a Catholic trade union in Mexico, founded in 1908. The movement did however disappear at the time of the Mexican Revolution.

References

Trade unions in Mexico

Trade unions established in 1908
1908 establishments in Mexico
Catholic trade unions